Let's Start Here is the fifth studio album by American rapper Lil Yachty, released on January 27, 2023, through Motown Records and Quality Control Music. It is his first studio album since Lil Boat 3 (2020) and follows his 2021 mixtape Michigan Boy Boat. The album is a departure from Lil Yachty's signature trap sound, and is instead heavily influenced by psychedelic rock.

Let's Start Here received generally positive reviews from music critics. It debuted at number nine on the US Billboard 200, earning 36,000 album-equivalent units in its first week.

Background and release
In a January 2022 interview, Lil Yachty said his next project would be a "non-rap album", calling it "alternative" and "like a psychedelic alternative project. It’s different. It's all live instrumentation." In December 2022, a project of Yachty's titled Sonic Ranch leaked on the Internet.

Lil Yachty officially announced the album on Instagram on January 17, 2023, posting the cover art, title, and release date. The cover is an AI-generated photograph of men and women wearing suits in a boardroom with "contorted facial features and warped smiles". Yachty's caption referred to it as "chapter 2", with Variety calling it "a potential redux" of the leaked Sonic Ranch.

On January 24, 2023, Yachty released a "thriller-style" skit in promotion of the album titled "Department of Mental Tranquility", in which he arrives at the titular department and is asked a series of questions by the receptionist in a waiting room full of people behaving erratically. He then walks down a narrow hallway and into a bright white room. The album was released on January 27, 2023.

Promotion
The music video for the album's tenth track "Say Something" was released on January 27, 2023. It was directed by Crowns & Owls. The song debuted at number 24 on the US Hot Rock & Alternative Songs.

Critical reception

Let's Start Here was met with generally positive reviews. At Metacritic, which assigns a rating out of 100 to reviews from professional publications, the album received a weighted average score of 76, based on eight reviews. Aggregator AnyDecentMusic? gave it 7.1 out of 10, based on their assessment of the critical consensus.

Jeff Ihaza of Rolling Stone praised the album, stating, "The rapper and musician's ambitious left-turn incorporates experimental rock and jazz with near-flawless execution, arriving at something that feels genuinely brand-new". Exclaim! critic Alex Hudson said, "Sure, he did appear on a Tame Impala remix last year, but few could have expected such a vivid and exploratory psych album as Let's Start Here". Fred Thomas of AllMusic praised the album, stating, "The cluttered labyrinth of weird experiments is held together by Yachty himself, still exhibiting the bold personality and curious spirit he showed on trap beats when singing emotively over psychedelic rock instrumentals". Tom Johnson from Beats Per Minute enjoyed the album, saying, "While opinions will certainly be divided on Let's Start Here, it's undeniable that a rapper hasn't committed so impressively and effortlessly to a rock genre since Kid Cudi's Nirvana-inspired Speedin' Bullet 2 Heaven. If anyone was going to do something this unexpected it was going to be Yachty". Robin Murray of Clash remarked that the album abandons Yachty's previous "straight-up rap for half-sung, half-spoken interludes", finding that "the results – though patchy – contain some of his best work yet". Murray concluded that with "every clipped, Silk Sonic esque moment – step forward 'drive ME crazy!' – there are moments of meandering musicality, and uncertain songcraft" but overall it "seems to point to a fresh beginning for Lil Yachty". Connor Flynn of Spectrum Culture said, "Despite its flaws, the album successfully blends psych and hip hop and puts a new spin on an old sound".

Reviewing the album for HipHopDX, Rebecca Barglowski stated, "Let's Start Here is exciting at the first listen because the style is new to Lil Yachty himself. Alas, the shiny sheen of new experiences tends to dull over time and with repetition". Alphonse Pierre of Pitchfork described the album as "a highly manicured and expensive blend of Tame Impala-style psych-rock, A24 synth-pop, loungey R&B, and Silk Sonic-esque funk, a sound so immediately appealing that it doesn't feel experimental at all". While Pierre complimented Yachty's "versatility" and for giving the "standout performance" on the "crowded project", Pierre remarked that he found Yachty's 2022 single "Poland" "stranger than anything here".

Commercial performance
Let's Start Here debuted at number nine on the US Billboard 200 chart, earning 36,000 album-equivalent units (including 4,000 copies in pure album sales) in its first week. This became Lil Yachty's third US top-10 debut on the chart. The album also accumulated a total of 41.34 million on-demand streams of the album's tracks.

Track listing

Notes
  signifies an additional producer
 All tracks are stylized in various ways, with varying punctuation at the ends of the titles and some words or letters capitalized (e.g. "pRETTy", ":(failure(:", "THE zone~", and "The Alchemist.").

Personnel
Credits adapted from liner notes.

Musicians
 Lil Yachty – vocals (all tracks)
 Diana Gordon – vocals (1, 8, 9)
 Teezo Touchdown – vocals (2)
 Justine Skye – vocals (3)
 Fousheé – vocals (4, 13)
 Baby K – background vocals (6)
 Ant Clemons – vocals (7)
 Benjamin Goldwasser – keyboards (8)
 Gillian Rivers – strings, strings direction (8, 10, 14)
 Jake Portrait – programming (9)
 Justin Raisen – background vocals (14)
 Daniel Caesar – vocals (14)
 Nick Hakim – vocals (14)

Technical
 Greg Calbi – mastering
 Steve Fallone – mastering
 Tom Elmhirst – mixing
 Miles BA Robinson – engineering (1–3, 5–14), vocal programming (1–3, 8)
 Justin Raisen – engineering (1, 3, 7, 11, 12, 14)
 Jake Portrait – engineering (1, 5, 7, 9, 12, 13)
 Anthony Lopez – engineering (1, 10, 14)
 SadPony – engineering (2, 10)
 Gent Memishi – engineering (3, 4, 10–13), vocal programming (4, 10)
 Patrick Wimberly – engineering (5, 11, 14)
 Ainjel Emme – engineering, vocal programming (10)
 Adam Hong – mixing assistance

Charts

Release history

References

2023 albums
Lil Yachty albums
Psychedelic rock albums by American artists
Quality Control Music albums